KATA may refer to:
 KATA (AM), a radio station (1340 AM) licensed to serve Arcata, California, United States
 KATA-CD, a low-power television station (channel 50) licensed to serve Mesquite, Texas, United States
 Kata, Japanese Martial arts movements